This is a list of notable international schools in the United States.

California
Alliant International University, Irvine, Fresno, Los Angeles, Sacramento, San Diego, San Francisco
American University Preparatory School, Los Angeles
French American International School, San Francisco
International Bilingual School, Palos Verdes Estates
International High School of San Francisco
La Petite Ecole du Lycée Français, San Diego
Lycée Français de San Francisco
Lycée Français de Los Angeles
Lycée International de Los Angeles, Burbank
Oakland International High School
San Diego French American School
Silicon Valley International School, Palo Alto and Menlo Park
Lycee International de Houston, Houston

Colorado
International School of Denver

Connecticut
Escuela Argentina en Greenwich, Greenwich
The International School at Dundee, Riverside
The Japanese School of New York, Greenwich
Whitby School, Greenwich

District of Columbia
British School of Washington
German School Washington, D.C. (DSW)
Washington International School
Creative Minds International PCS

Florida
American High School
International Torah Academy
Schiller International University
North Broward Preparatory School
Windermere Preparatory School

Georgia
Atlanta International School
Seigakuin Atlanta International School, Peachtree Corners

Hawaii
Varsity International School, Honolulu

Illinois
British International School of Chicago Lincoln Park
British International School of Chicago, South Loop
Chicago Futabakai Japanese School, Arlington Heights
La Petite École de Chicago, Hyde Park Campus, Chicago
La Petite École de Chicago, Winnetka Campus, Winnetka
Lycée Français de Chicago
Scuola Italiana Enrico Fermi, Chicago

Indiana
International School of Indiana, Indianapolis

Maryland
Lycée Rochambeau, Bethesda

Massachusetts
British International School of Boston
International School of Boston, Cambridge
Snowden International School, Boston
German International School Boston

Michigan
International Academy, Bloomfield Hills
International Academy of Macomb, Clinton Township

Minnesota
Saint Paul Preparatory School, St Paul
The International School of Minnesota, Eden Prairie

Nevada
Henderson International School, Henderson

New Jersey
The New Jersey Japanese School, Oakland
Princeton International School of Mathematics and Science, Princeton

New Mexico
Armand Hammer United World College of the American West, Montezuma

New York
Avenues: The World School, New York City
British International School of New York
College of Staten Island High School for International Studies, New York City
Dwight School, New York City
EF International Academy
The Flushing International High School, New York City
French-American School of New York, Westchester County
German International School New York, White Plains
The International High School, New York City
Keio Academy of New York, Purchase
Lycée Français de New York, New York City
La Scuola d'Italia Guglielmo Marconi, New York City
Pine Street School, New York City
United Nations International School, New York City

North Carolina
American Hebrew Academy, Greensboro
British American School of Charlotte

Oregon
French American International School, Portland
International School of Beaverton

South Carolina
The British International School of Charlotte
French Bilingual School of South Carolina, Wade Hampton

Tennessee
Tennessee Meiji Gakuin High School, Sweetwater

Texas
Austin International School
Awty International School, Houston
British International School of Houston
Dallas International School
Faith West Academy, Katy
The Village School, Houston
Lycee International de Houston, Houston

Washington
French Immersion School of Washington, Bellevue
International Community School, Kirkland
International School, Bellevue

West Virginia
Bluefield International Academy, Bluefield

See also

Lists of schools in the United States
List of Baptist schools in the United States
List of independent Catholic schools in the United States
List of Lutheran schools in the United States

 
International schools
United States